In computer science, the Akra–Bazzi method, or Akra–Bazzi theorem, is used to analyze the asymptotic behavior of the mathematical recurrences that appear in the analysis of divide and conquer algorithms where the sub-problems have substantially different  sizes. It is a generalization of the master theorem for divide-and-conquer recurrences, which assumes that the sub-problems have equal size. It is named after mathematicians Mohamad Akra and Louay Bazzi.

Formulation 
The Akra–Bazzi method applies to recurrence formulas of the form:

The conditions for usage are:

 sufficient base cases are provided
  for all 
  for all 
 , where c is a constant and O notates Big O notation
  for all 
  is a constant

(see Θ). Similarly, one can also ignore the ceiling function. For example,  and  will, as per the Akra–Bazzi theorem, have the same asymptotic behavior.

Example 
In this example, . Then, using the formula, the asymptotic behavior can be determined as follows:

Significance 
The Akra–Bazzi method is more useful than most other techniques for determining asymptotic behavior because it covers such a wide variety of cases. Its primary application is the approximation of the running time of many divide-and-conquer algorithms.

for integers , and can thus be computed using the Akra–Bazzi method to be .

See also
 Master theorem (analysis of algorithms)
 Asymptotic complexity

References

External links 
 O Método de Akra-Bazzi na Resolução de Equações de Recorrência 

Asymptotic analysis
Theorems in discrete mathematics
Recurrence relations
Bazzi family